Global Heresy (alternately titled Rock My World in the United States and Canada) is a 2002 comedy-drama film directed by Sidney J. Furie, and starring Peter O'Toole, Joan Plowright, Alicia Silverstone and Martin Clunes. The film centers on a highly successful American rock band recovering from the loss of their leader by going into seclusion in the United Kingdom.

Plot
When a rock band at the top of their game suddenly loses their band leader/bass player, their musical direction becomes questionable. All the band members know is that the leader's clothes were found at the edge of a waterfront and he has not been seen since. To replace their missing leader, they hire a new bassist, Natalie (Alicia Silverstone), who shakes up their thoughts of the band. However, the biggest changes come when the band decides to go into seclusion to develop new songs and a new sound. They rent a mansion from an aristocratic couple, Lord (Peter O'Toole) and Lady Foxley (Joan Plowright), who are in need of money. When the staff hired to be on hand when the band arrives do not show, the couple decides to act as the butler, Benson, and the cook, Margaret. The obvious conflicts between the two cultures occur, but a respect for each other gradually follows. Meanwhile, the band's recording company is trying to trick them into signing a contract that obliges them to make the music as the company requires, denying their "creative control". Towards the end of the film, the status quo becomes further shaken when the original band leader shows up and admits that his disappearance had been a planned publicity stunt.

Cast

Production
The film was shot in Toronto.

Reception
Liam Lacey of The Globe and Mail awarded the film two and a half stars out of four.

References

External links
 
 

2002 films
2002 comedy-drama films
2002 direct-to-video films
American comedy-drama films
British comedy-drama films
Canadian comedy-drama films
English-language Canadian films
Films about musical groups
Films directed by Sidney J. Furie
Films shot in Gloucestershire
Films shot in Toronto
Publicity stunts in fiction
2000s English-language films
2000s American films
2000s Canadian films
2000s British films